Dominion City is an unincorporated community in the Municipality of Emerson – Franklin, Manitoba Canada.

Dominion City is served by Roseau Valley School. The community also has a pool, a museum, a bank, a credit union, a general store, a hockey rink, a curling club, and a nine-hole golf course. Historic buildings in Dominion City include All Saints Anglican Church, which is now used as the Franklin Museum.

The original name of the community was Roseau, later Roseau Crossing.  It changed to the current name in 1878 to avoid confusion with similarly-named communities, such as Roseau, Minnesota.  The "City" was added in keeping with Crystal City and Rapid City.  The post office was called Roseau Crossing upon establishment in 1876 and renamed Dominion City in 1880.

Demographics 

Notable people
Jacob Anderson, priest
Buddy Knox, 1950s rock and roll star
Julie Masi, musician, member of The Parachute Club 
Denton Mateychuk, ice hockey player

References 

 Geographic Names of Manitoba (pg. 65) - the Millennium Bureau of Canada

Designated places in Manitoba
Unincorporated communities in Eastman Region, Manitoba